Kenneth Foote (born August 2, 1948) from the Woods Hole Oceanographic Institution, Woods Hole, MA was named Fellow of the Institute of Electrical and Electronics Engineers (IEEE) in 2015 for contributions to quantification of underwater sound scattering. He also competed in the men's quadruple sculls event at the 1976 Summer Olympics.

References 

1948 births
Fellow Members of the IEEE
Living people
American male rowers
Olympic rowers of the United States
Rowers at the 1976 Summer Olympics
Sportspeople from Baltimore
American electrical engineers